Ernesto de Souza Andrade Júnior (July 12, 1966), better known as Netinho, is a Brazilian singer and composer.

Early life and Career 
Born in Santo Antônio de Jesus, Bahia, Ernesto de Souza Andrade Júnior started his career early. He was given his first guitar at the age of 14 by his mother. De Souza Andrade enrolled at the Catholic University of Salvador in the Civil Engineering program. At the same time, he started playing music professionally in bars in Salvador, performing a repertoire of Brasilian popular music and Bossa Nova. In 1984, he discovered Carnival, falling in love with the energy of the electric trios and with the contagious joy of Bahian music. In the same year, he paraded as a reveler in Bloco Beijo, still in charge of Luiz Caldas & Banda Accordes Verdes.

1988–92: Banda Beijo
Netinho began his career in 1988 as a vocalist for Banda Beijo, debuting on the Carnival circuit at the age of 22. He recorded his first album with Beijo. The single "Beijo na Boca" received radio play throughout Brazil, gaining the band's national attention for the first time. Netinho (or Banda Beijo?) was the first axé musician to present on the television show Domingão do Faustão.

Netinho's third album with Beijo was recorded in 1990 for BMG. The album had its released in Salvador, Bahia on the roof of Shopping Barra. At the release, about 40,000 people gathered in the parking lot and nearby streets.

A year later, with PolyGram, Netinho recorded Badameiro. The year after that, he recorded Aconteceu, Axé Music. This album came during a time when micaretas celebrations were becoming increasingly popular in Brazil[cite?].

During the 1990 FIFA World Cup in Italy, Netinho toured the host country with an electric trio, encountering European fans for the first time. The trio traveled by boat, taking two months to arrive in Italy.

Netinho has always directed his concerts in addition to singing. He started to manage blocks and trios in the Bahian carnival. This has become the main activity in his career.

In 1992, Netinho became the first Brazilian artist to parade with an electric trio when he played in Rio de Janeiro, on Avenida Atlântica, in Copacabana.

1993–2001: Solo career and success
In 1993 he recorded his first solo CD, Um Beijo pra Você; with this album four hits broke out, being "Menina", the soundtrack of the soap opera Tropicaliente. For that record, Netinho received the first platinum record in Brazil and the first gold in Chile. In 1994 he recorded another album, Nada Vai Nos Separar, and the song "Como" gained space on the soundtrack of the soap opera História de Amor. In São Paulo, Rio de Janeiro, and Los Angeles, he recorded the album Netinho, which also won a song on Rede Globo, this time on the series Malhação. The eighth career album had a special flavor, recorded in Aracaju in 1996, entitled Netinho ao Vivo!, with the success "Milla", re-recorded by the band Jheremmias Não Bate Córner (which gave rise to Jammil and Uma Noites). The song, sung throughout Brazil, broke performance records and was re-recorded in more than eight languages, including Russian. In the same year, Netinho received the title of Citizen Sergipano of the Municipality of Aracaju.

In the following year, it was the CD Me Leva, with the song "Pra Te Ter Aqui" that entered the soundtrack of the soap opera Corpo Dourado, from Rede Globo, and became a success throughout Brazil. The song "Você É Linda", a song by Caetano Veloso performed by Netinho on the CD Alguém Cantando Caetano entered the score of the series Malhação. In 1998, after a long tour of Portugal, Netinho returned to Brazil to create, direct and launch Rádio Brasil, a project that involved a CD and show with technological innovations, launched by PolyGram. In the same year, the song "Indecisão" entered the soundtrack of the soap opera Andando Nas Nuvens. That same year the singer relaunched Banda Beijo and introduced the singer Gilmelândia to Brazil. The CD released by Netinho with a lot of musical mixes, including the recording of Phil Collins' version "Against All Odds", which became "Forever I Will Love You", and the song "'O Surdato' Nnammurato", who entered the soundtrack of the soap opera Terra Nostra.

Due to the success of "Pra Te Ter Aqui", the theme of the soap opera by Rede Globo Corpo Dourado, the singer participated in the soap opera, in chapter 52, shown on Tuesday, March 17, 1998. In 1999, the singer made notable participation in the album A Arca dos Bichos. The singers participating in the album were: Ivete Sangalo, Reinaldo (Terra Samba), Carla Visi, Sandy, Beto Jamaica, Claudinho & Buchecha, Netinho, Gil (Banda Beijo), Chico César, Zeca Baleiro, Ed Motta, Paulo Ricardo , and Xuxa. Later, in 2010–2013, this project became for the stage. In 2000, Netinho crossed the Atlantic with his electric trio and landed in Europe to celebrate the 500th anniversary of Brazil, in Lisbon, where he made a carnival for 80 thousand of people at Parque das Nações. The song "Química Perfeita" (in Spanish), a duet with Ivete Sangalo, was the song chosen for Rede Globo's soap opera, As Filhas da Mãe.

2002–present: Ripening
In 2002, he participated in the second edition of “Portugal Elétrico”, in Portugal and for a show in Africa. In the same year, he recorded the album Zuêra, by Universal Music, with reinterpretations of MPB classics, in a dancing pop format. In the same year, the singer left the record company. In 2003, Netinho spent the whole year away from professional activities. Netinho took advantage of his distance from the media and decided to record a CD with his compositions, which was released in 2005 by EMI Music, entitled Another Version. 2006 was a remarkable year in Netinho's life, after all this was the year of the artist's return to the public in Bahia and Brazil. During this period the singer recorded his first DVD, at Concha Acústica of Teatro Castro Alves, with special guests such as singer Ivete Sangalo and the group Ilê Aiyê. From this new season came the success "Tá Bom", in a partnership with Carlinhos Brown, which was one of the great successes of the Carnival of Bahia in 2007.  Netinho returned to Carnaval in Bahia by pulling the Trimix Block for three days at the Barra / Ondina Circuit. Right after the carnival, the compositions "Onde Você Se Esconde", recorded on her DVD with the participation of Ivete Sangalo, and the song "Na Capoeira" in honor of the Salvador Carnival, became the singer's new successes. In 2008 the CD Minha Praia released by the Som Livre label brought the re-recording of the song "Caça e Caçador", a success in the voice of Fábio Junior, in addition to the success "Muito Bom" that broke out on radio stations across the country.

In 2009, Netinho celebrated 20 years of his career. In September, he recorded in Aracaju (SE), for about six thousand people, in the green area of Hotel Parque dos Coqueiros, his second DVD Netinho and Caixa Mágica, with the participation of friends Saulo Fernandes (Banda Eva), Alinne Rosa (Cheiro de Amor), Tomate, D'Black and a virtual and special participation by Jorge Vercillo. In parallel to all this, Netinho was nominated for a Latin Grammy in 2009 in the category of best album of the music of Brazilian roots (Regional Tropical) for the CD, Minha Praia. In addition, it was awarded in the music category, in the first version of the Brazilian Award Brazil award. Netinho released a clip with the DVD images and had more than 10,000 hits on YouTube in less than a month and, in October, the first working song, "Extrapolou", was already on all radio stations in the country. In 2010, Netinho released the second working song and the clip for "Apertadinho". After careful editing work, the DVD was officially released in August. The DVD is rich in interpretation and enchantment, which are present in the 23 tracks of the work. In the repertoire, between re-recordings with a different guise and unpublished ones, highlighted were Crença, Pra Te Ter Aqui e Onde Você Esconde, besides the new Extrapolou, Apertadinho, and Erê. For the first time, a Bahian artist recorded a DVD in HD quality. And for the reproduction to be faithful to the technology used during recording, DVD Netinho and Caixa Mágica will have a limited edition in Blu-ray.

Personal life
Between 1997 and 2003, Netinho was married to journalist Mariana Trindade, with whom he had a daughter, Bruna (2000). In 2008, during an interview for the magazine Quem he declared to be bisexual. In 2017 he became a vegan. Netinho was admitted to the hospital on April 24, 2013, after doctors found that he was bleeding from his liver after a biopsy. He was diagnosed with liver adenomas due to the indiscriminate use of anabolic androgenic steroids, which subsequently caused a series of strokes, further complicating the singer's clinical condition. Netinho declared that he did not know that what he was taking was prohibited anabolic steroids, believing that they were supplements for training, and sued his then-doctor, Mohamad Barakat. However, Mohamad sued Netinho for false accusation, but lost the case, as the judge understands that it is the right of any citizen to question medical methods.

Netinho became a conservative in 2016, and is a supporter of President Jair Bolsonaro. He is also a critic of the LGBT movement.

Netinho filiated to the Liberal Party to run for federal deputy for Bahia in the 2022 election.

Discography

Studio albums
 Um Beijo Pra Você (1993)
 Nada Vai Nos Separar (1994)
 Netinho (1995)
 Me Leva (1997)
 Rádio Brasil (1998)
 Clareou (1999)
 Corpo Cabeça (2000)
 Outra Versão (2005)
 Minha Praia (2008)
 Uma Noite no Forró Elétrico (2012)
 Beats, Baladas & Balanços (2014)

Live albums
 Netinho ao Vivo! (1996)
 Terra Carnavális (2001)
 Por Inteiro (2006)
 Netinho e a Caixa Mágica (2010)

References

External links
Official website
 Facebook
 Instagram

1966 births
Living people
Brazilian anti-communists
Conservatism in Brazil
21st-century Brazilian male singers
21st-century Brazilian singers
Brazilian male singer-songwriters
20th-century Brazilian male singers
20th-century Brazilian singers
Brazilian Christians
Brazilian LGBT singers
LGBT people in Latin music